Ken Currie (3 September 1925 – 22 March 2017) was a Scottish footballer who played as a forward. Currie played for Hearts, Third Lanark, Raith Rovers, Dunfermline Athletic and Stranraer.

References

1925 births
2017 deaths
Sportspeople from Midlothian
Scottish footballers
Association football inside forwards
Heart of Midlothian F.C. players
Third Lanark A.C. players
Raith Rovers F.C. players
Dunfermline Athletic F.C. players
Stranraer F.C. players
Wigtown & Bladnoch F.C. players
Scottish Football League players